Blizhny , rural localities in Russia, may refer to:

 Blizhny, Chelyabinsk Oblast, a settlement
 Blizhny, Kemerovo Oblast, a settlement
 Blizhny, Krasnodar Krai, a settlement
 Blizhny, Kursk Oblast, a khutor
 Blizhny, Orenburg Oblast, a settlement
 Blizhny, Alexandrov-Gaysky District, Saratov Oblast, a khutor
 Blizhny, Novouzensky District, Saratov Oblast, a khutor
 Blizhny, Volgograd Oblast, a khutor

See also
 Blizhny Sakhalin